
Gmina Mały Płock is a rural gmina (administrative district) in Kolno County, Podlaskie Voivodeship, in north-eastern Poland.

Villages
Gmina Mały Płock contains the villages and settlements of Budy Żelazne, Budy-Kozłówka, Chludnie, Cwaliny Duże, Cwaliny Małe, Józefowo, Kąty, Kołaki-Strumienie, Kołaki-Wietrzychowo, Korzeniste, Krukówka, Mały Płock, Mściwuje, Nowe Rakowo, Popki, Rogienice Piaseczne, Rogienice Wielkie, Rogienice-Wypychy, Ruda-Skroda, Rudka-Skroda, Śmiarowo, Stare Rakowo, Waśki, Włodki, Wygrane and Zalesie.

Neighbouring gminas
Gmina Mały Płock is bordered by the gminas of Kolno, Łomża, Nowogród, Piątnica, Stawiski and Zbójna.

Notable people
Anzia Yezierska

References

Polish official population figures 2006

Maly Plock
Kolno County